The Girl from Piccadilly is a 1921 German silent film directed by Frederic Zelnik and starring Lya Mara, Erich Kaiser-Titz, and Fritz Schulz. It was released in two separate parts.

Cast
Lya Mara
Erich Kaiser-Titz
Fritz Schulz
Albert Patry
Charles Puffy
Wilhelm Diegelmann
Paul Passarge
Ressel Orla
Gertrud Arnold
Josef Peterhans
Josef Commer

Max Ruhbeck
Ida Perry
Hermann Picha

References

External links

Films of the Weimar Republic
Films directed by Frederic Zelnik
German silent feature films
German black-and-white films